Antanandava is a rural commune in Madagascar. It belongs to the district of Ambatondrazaka, which is a part of Alaotra-Mangoro Region. The population of the commune was 11,013  in 2018.

Economy
The economy of the commune is based on agriculture. Rice, corn, beans, manioc, arachide and tobacco are the mostly grown products.

Situated close to the commune is the Zahamena National Park.

References
TENUE FONCIERE ESPACES OUVERTS DANS LA COMMUNE RURALE D’ANTANANDAVA – DISTRICT D’AMBATONDRAZAKA

Populated places in Alaotra-Mangoro